Datsik may refer to:

Viacheslav Datsik (born 1980), Russian MMA fighter and Neo-Nazi
Datsik (musician) (born 1988), Canadian dubstep DJ and music producer